Cars Plus is a football (soccer) club in Guam. They play in the Guam Soccer League.

Achievements
Guam Soccer League 
 2010–11

References

Football clubs in Guam